is a Japanese general merchandise, Shopping Center, Grocery store and department store, originally founded in 1920. In 2005, it was reorganized, as part of a corporate restructuring, as a subsidiary of the Seven & I Holdings Co.

As of March 2013, there are 178 Ito-Yokado stores operating in Japan. Since entering the Chinese market in 1997, opening their first store in the Chunxilu shopping district of Chengdu, the company has been operating eight stores in Beijing and six in Chengdu. The company formed a joint venture with Wangfujing Department Store and China Huafu Trade & Development Group Corp. to open one of five stores in Beijing. As of January 2013, there are fourteen Ito-Yokado stores in China.

Musical Codes

Inside Ito-Yokado, the staff working at the register can play instrumentals of famous musical pieces, which is a code to workers in the store for specific things to do. These are:

 Help! - (The Beatles) - A call for additional staff to man the tills during periods of high customer traffic.
 Daydream Believer (The Monkees) - Played during ordinary operation.
 Rhythm of the Rain  (The Cascades) - To inform customers of heavy rain outside the building.
 Carmen - Robbery and other criminal activities in the premises.
 Symphony No. 5, 1st. Movement (Allegro con brio) (Beethoven) - Bomb threat.

References

External links

  

Japanese companies established in 1920
Retail companies established in 1920
2005 mergers and acquisitions
Supermarkets of Japan
Retail companies based in Tokyo
Seven & I Holdings
Japanese brands